Jens Klingmann (born 16 July 1990 in Heidelberg) is a German racing driver.

Career

Formula BMW
In 2006, Klingmann moved up to Formula BMW ADAC with Eifelland Racing. He finished his first FBMW campaign fourth in the Drivers' Championship with 121 points behind fellow German Marco Holzer. In 2007, Klingmann stayed with the same team, where he won the Drivers' Championship with 699 points and taking ten race wins, his nearest rival being Spain's Daniel Campos-Hull.

Formula Three
In 2008, Klingmann stepped up to the Formula 3 Euro Series with Italian team RC Motorsport. He finished 27th in the championship standings, without scoring a point.

Racing career

Career summary

Complete WeatherTech SportsCar Championship results
(key) (Races in bold indicate pole position; results in italics indicate fastest lap)

References

External links
 Official website 
 Jens Klingmann career statistics at Driver Database

German racing drivers
1990 births
Living people
Sportspeople from Heidelberg
Formula BMW ADAC drivers
Formula 3 Euro Series drivers
Racing drivers from Baden-Württemberg
Blancpain Endurance Series drivers
ADAC GT Masters drivers
24 Hours of Spa drivers
24 Hours of Daytona drivers
24H Series drivers
Nürburgring 24 Hours drivers
WeatherTech SportsCar Championship drivers
Asian Le Mans Series drivers
BMW M drivers
Eifelland Racing drivers
RC Motorsport drivers
Abt Sportsline drivers
TDS Racing drivers
Rahal Letterman Lanigan Racing drivers
Rowe Racing drivers
Schnitzer Motorsport drivers
Boutsen Ginion Racing drivers
W Racing Team drivers
Michelin Pilot Challenge drivers